The  was a fleet of the Imperial Japanese Navy (IJN) established during World War II as a result of IJN commands being isolated in the Philippines.

History
The commander in chief of the IJN 1st Southern Expeditionary Fleet based in Singapore was named commander in chief of the newly created Tenth Area Fleet on 1 February 1944. As the Southwest Area Fleet (Imperial Japanese Navy) command staff was isolated in the Philippines, a new command structure was necessary to direct the 1st and 2nd Fleets and the surviving elements of the IJN 5th Fleet. It was supported by the IJN 13th Air Fleet. The 10th Area Fleet had responsibility for the defenses of Indonesia and Indochina. It lost most of its combat capability at the Battle of the Malacca Strait and when Ashigara was sunk by HMS Trenchant and was disbanded at the end of the Pacific War.

The Tenth Area Fleet was a theatre command and its name was taken sequentially from the numbered fleets rather than from the area in which it was located.

Structure of the 10th Area Fleet

Commanders of the 10th Area Fleet
Commander in chief 

Chief of staff

References

Notes

Books

External links

10
Military units and formations established in 1944
Military units and formations disestablished in 1945